The 2008 European Canoe Slalom Championships took place at the Kraków-Kolna Canoe Slalom Course in Kraków, Poland between May 8 and 11, 2008 under the auspices of the European Canoe Association (ECA). It was the 9th edition. These championships also served as the Olympic qualification for the 2008 Summer Olympics.

Medal summary

Men's results

Canoe

Kayak

Women's results

Kayak

Medal table

References
 Official results
 European Canoe Association

European Canoe Slalom Championships
European Canoe Slalom Championships
European Canoe Slalom Championships
Sports competitions in Kraków
Canoeing and kayaking competitions in Poland
International sports competitions hosted by Poland
21st century in Kraków
May 2008 sports events in Europe